Chu Si is a 2018 Burmese drama film, directed by Min Oo starring Kyaw Htet Aung, Melody, Aye Myat Thu, Ei Chaw Po, May, Nan Su Oo and Soe Moe Kyi. The film, produced by Aung Khit Min Film Production premiered in Myanmar on September 14, 2018.

Cast
Kyaw Htet Aung as Lin Oo Maung
Melody as Saw Kay Thi
Aye Myat Thu as Ma Htet
Ei Chaw Po as Myat Noe
May as Esther
Nan Su Oo as Htike Htike
Soe Moe Kyi as Ma Ma Nan

References

2018 films
2010s Burmese-language films
Burmese drama films
Films shot in Myanmar